Syarinidae is a family of pseudoscorpions in the order Pseudoscorpiones. There are at least 20 genera and 110 described species in Syarinidae.

Genera
These 20 genera belong to the family Syarinidae:

 Aglaochitra J. C. Chamberlin, 1952 i c g
 Alocobisium Beier, 1952 i c g
 Anysrius Harvey, 1998 i c g
 Arcanobisium Zaragoza, 2010 g
 Chitrella Beier, 1932 i c g
 Chitrellina Muchmore, 1996 i c g
 Hadoblothrus Beier, 1952 i c g
 Hyarinus J. C. Chamberlin, 1925 i c g
 Ideobisium Balzan, 1892 i c g
 Ideoblothrus Balzan, 1892 i c g
 Lusoblothrus Zaragoza & Reboleira, 2012 g
 Micracreagrella g
 Micracreagrina g
 Microblothrus Mahnert, 1985 i c g
 Microcreagrella Beier, 1961 i c g
 Microcreagrina Beier, 1961 i c g
 Nannobisium Beier, 1931 i c g
 Pararoncus J. C. Chamberlin, 1938 i c g
 Pseudoblothrus Beier, 1931 i c g
 Syarinus J. C. Chamberlin, 1925 i c g b

Data sources: i = ITIS, c = Catalogue of Life, g = GBIF, b = Bugguide.net

References

Further reading

External links

 
 

Neobisioidea
Pseudoscorpion families